"Sawmill Road" is a song written by Dan Truman, Sam Hogin and Jim McBride, and recorded by American country music group Diamond Rio.  It was released in November 1993 as the fourth and final single from the album Close to the Edge.  The song reached #21 on the Billboard Hot Country Singles & Tracks chart.

Chart performance

References

1994 singles
1992 songs
Diamond Rio songs
Arista Nashville singles
Songs written by Sam Hogin
Songs written by Jim McBride (songwriter)